Sir John Bernard Burke,  (5 January 1814 – 12 December 1892) was a British genealogist and Ulster King of Arms, who helped publish Burke's Peerage.

Personal life
Burke, of Irish descent, was born at London and was educated in London and France. His father, John Burke (1787–1848), was also a notable genealogist who first produced, in 1826, a Genealogical and Heraldic Dictionary of the Peerage and Baronetage of the United Kingdom. This work, generally known as Burke's Peerage, was issued annually starting in 1847.

While practising as a barrister Bernard Burke assisted his father in his genealogical work, including the two volumes entitled The Royal Families of England, Scotland, and Wales, with their Descendants &c., which were not published until after his father's death (volume 1 in 1848, volume 2 in 1851), following which he took control of his publications. In 1853 Burke was appointed Ulster King of Arms. 

In 1854, he was knighted. In 1855, he became Keeper of the State Papers in Ireland. After having devoted his life to genealogical studies he died in Dublin on 12 December 1892. He was succeeded as editor of Burke's Peerage and Landed Gentry by his fourth son, Ashworth Peter Burke.

Continuing his strong family tradition of genealogy and heraldry, another of Burke's sons, Sir Henry Farnham Burke, would eventually attain the office of Garter Principal King of Arms.

Works
In addition to editing Burke's Peerage from 1847 until his death, Sir Bernard brought out several editions of a companion volume, Burke's Landed Gentry, which was first published between 1833 and 1838. In 1866 and 1883 he published editions of his father's Dictionary of the Peerages of England, Scotland and Ireland, extinct, dormant and in abeyance (earlier editions, 1831,1840, 1846); and in 1855 and 1876 editions of his Royal Families of England, Scotland and Wales (1st edition, 1847–1851). Integral to the study of historians was the publication in 1878 (enlarged edition in 1883) of his Encyclopaedia of Heraldry, or General Armory of England, Scotland and Ireland was published in 1848.

Sir Bernard's own works include:
The Roll of Battle Abbey (1848)
A Visitation of the Seats and Arms of the Noblemen and Gentlemen of Great Britain Vol. 1 (1852)
The Romance of the Aristocracy (1855)
The Romance of the Forum (1855-)
Vicissitudes of Families (1883, and several earlier editions)
The Rise of Great Families (1882)
A Genealogical and Heraldic History of the Colonial Gentry. Vols 1 & 2 (1891)

Arms

See also
King of Arms
College of Arms
Genealogical Office
Heraldry

References

External links
Burke's Peerage website
College of Arms website
A Visition of the Seats and Arms of the Noblemen and Gentlemen of Great Britain, Vol. 1. Digitised Book

1814 births
1892 deaths
House of Burgh
English genealogists
Irish officers of arms
Companions of the Order of the Bath
Knights Bachelor
Writers from Dublin (city)
Writers from London